Conotalopia tropicalis is a species of sea snail, a marine gastropod mollusk in the family Trochidae, the top snails.

Description
The height of the shell attains 3.15 mm, its diameter 3.75 mm.  The small, rather thin shell has a depressedly conical shape and is widely umbilicate. Its colour is grey, turning to pink on the body whorl, a few scattered crimson dots on the larger ribs. The shell contains 4½ whorls. The spire is biangulate. The body whorl is angled at the shoulder, periphery and base. The sculpture consists of a well-developed spiral rib that girdles the periphery. Parted from this by broad interspaces runs a similar one above and another below. On the base are four smaller spirals followed by a larger granulate rib which borders the umbilicus. Within the broad and deep umbilicus continues a succession of granulose spirals. The flat subsutural shell is traversed by radial plications and the whole shell is overrun by dense, fine, radial threads. The simple aperture is subcircular.

Distribution
This marine species is endemic to Australia and occurs on the continental shelf off Queensland.

References

 Wilson, B. 1993. Australian Marine Shells. Prosobranch Gastropods. Kallaroo, Western Australia : Odyssey Publishing Vol. 1 408 pp.

External links
  To World Register of Marine Species

tropicalis
Gastropods described in 1907